Purnong or Purnong Landing is the location of a cable ferry across the Murray River upstream of Mannum. The town is on the cliffs above the left (eastern) bank of the river.

The town was surveyed in 1911 and named for an Aboriginal word meaning at the wide place. The ferry crossing is the shortest in South Australia, but there are lagoons adjacent to the river.

Purnong Primary School closed in December 1983.

See also
List of crossings of the Murray River

References

Towns in South Australia